Alexander Marson is an American biologist and infectious disease doctor, specializing in genetics, human immunology, and CRISPR genome engineering. He is the Director of the Gladstone-UCSF Institute of Genomic Immunology, and a tenured Professor with a dual appointment in the Department of Medicine and the Department of Microbiology & Immunology at the University of California, San Francisco (UCSF).

He is best known for his work with Clustered Regularly Interspaced Short Palindromic Repeats (CRISPR), specifically for his advances in furthering understanding of the genomics of human T cell function. Marson also currently holds affiliations with the Parker Institute for Cancer Immunotherapy (PICI), the Chan Zuckerberg Biohub, and the Innovative Genomics Institute (IGI).

Marson's team is pioneering new CRISPR gene editing technologies that aim to offer faster, cheaper and more precise ways to re-write DNA programs in human immune cells. With these tools, the lab is engineering cells to treat a wide range of diseases. They are designing programs to make cells that can recognize and eliminate cancer, cells that are resistant to infections like HIV, and cells that can reduce inflammation in autoimmune diseases like multiple sclerosis, type 1 diabetes, and rheumatoid arthritis. Reprogrammed human immune cells are emerging as a new class of “living” medicines.

Early life and education
Alex Marson was born June 5, 1979 in Manhattan, NY.  He is the son of Ellen Marson, a Professor of Spanish literature and former director of Hadassah, and Bernard Marson, an architect. Marson received an A.B. in biology summa cum laude from Harvard University in 2001. He received a master's degree in Biological Sciences from the University of Cambridge in 2003. Marson received a Ph.D. in Biology from Massachusetts Institute of Technology in 2008, under the guidance of Rick Young and Rudolf Jaenisch at the Whitehead Institute.

Research & Career
Marson's research focuses on reprogramming human immune cells, especially T cells, with CRISPR. The applications of this research are in the treatment of cancer, autoimmune diseases, HIV and a wide range of other diseases. In August 2018, Marson was selected as Wired Magazine's 25 Icons of the next 25 Years for his research in DNA programming and genome editing for cancer immunotherapy.

COVID-19
In April & May 2020, Marson and colleagues at UCSF, the Gladstone Institutes, & UC Berkeley collaborated on the meta-testing of COVID-19 antibody tests to verify the accuracy of results. Dr. Marson was featured on CNN, PBS, NBC, NPR, and MSNBC speaking about this work.

Affiliations
Marson is the scientific director for biomedicine at the Innovative Genomics Institute (IGI). He is a member of the Parker Institute for Cancer Immunotherapy and was selected as one of the inaugural Chan Zuckerberg Biohub investigators.

Awards and recognition
 2016 - American Society for Clinical Investigation (ASCI) Young Physician-Scientist Award
 2016 - Burroughs Wellcome Foundation Career Award for Medical Scientists
 2016 - NIDA/NIH Avenir New Innovator Award
 2016 - Parker Institute for Cancer Immunotherapy, Project Member
 2017 - Chan Zuckerberg Biohub Investigator
 2018 - Parker Institute for Cancer Immunotherapy, Member[10]

References

American molecular biologists
Harvard College alumni
Alumni of the University of Cambridge
Massachusetts Institute of Technology School of Science alumni
University of California, San Francisco faculty
1979 births
Living people
Harvard Medical School alumni